Tom Mäkitalo (born May 6, 1995) is a Swedish ice hockey player. He is currently playing with Leksands IF of the Swedish Hockey League (SHL).

Mäkitalo made his Swedish Hockey League debut playing with Leksands IF during the 2014–15 SHL season.

Mäkitalo's father, Jarmo Mäkitalo, is a Finnish former ice hockey player who played in the Elitserien.

References

External links

1995 births
Living people
Leksands IF players
Swedish ice hockey centres
Swedish people of Finnish descent